Irinej Dobrijević (born 6 February 1955) is the Serbian Orthodox Bishop of Eastern America since 2016. He is the head of the Serbian Orthodox Eparchy of Eastern America. Formerly, Irinej was the Serbian Orthodox Bishop of Australia and New Zealand (2011–2016).

References

1955 births
Bishops of the Serbian Orthodox Church
Living people
Serbian Orthodox Church in Australia
Serbian Orthodox Church in New Zealand
Eastern Orthodox Christians from the United States
Religious leaders from Cleveland